János Aknai Acht (1908–1992), also referred to as Eugène Acht or Paul Acht, was a Hungarian footballer who played as a goalkeeper. At club level, he played for both Újpest FC in his native country, for US Tourcoing, Red Star, and Marseille in France, and for Valencia in Spain. He represented the Hungary national team at international level.

Career
Aknai played 54 matches for Újpest FC, winning the Mitropa Cup 1929 and the Coupe des Nations 1930. He then moved to France, first with US Tourcoing.

He had a short spell with Valencia CF, and came back to France where he played for Red Star in 1935–36 (14 matches) and Olympique de Marseille.

References

External links

La Liga player stats
Profile at om1899

1908 births
1992 deaths
Footballers from Budapest
Hungarian footballers
Association football goalkeepers
Hungary international footballers
Ligue 1 players
Ligue 2 players
La Liga players
Újpest FC players
US Tourcoing FC players
Valencia CF players
Red Star F.C. players
Olympique de Marseille players
Hungarian expatriate footballers
Expatriate footballers in France
Hungarian expatriate sportspeople in France
Expatriate footballers in Spain
Hungarian expatriate sportspeople in Spain